Southfort is an unincorporated community in DeSoto County, Florida, United States, located approximately  south of Fort Ogden on U.S. Route 17.

Geography

References

Unincorporated communities in DeSoto County, Florida
Unincorporated communities in Florida